Delphinium nudicaule, known by the common names canyon larkspur, red larkspur, orange larkspur, and canyon delphinium, is a flowering herbaceous perennial plant in the buttercup family Ranunculaceae. It is native to low-elevation canyons and slopes, foothills, and mountain ranges of California, US, from the Sierra Nevada to the California Coast Ranges, and of Oregon. It grows below .

The plant sends up thin and long  stems with finely dissected leaves. It bears attractive larkspur flowers in shades of red and orange that are generally pollinated by hummingbirds. D. nudicaule readily hybridizes with several other species of Delphinium.

Uses
The root of Delphinium nudicaule has been historically used as a medicinal narcotic, chiefly by the Mendocino Native Americans of the Yuki tribe.
The Concow tribe called the plant sō-ma’ in the Konkow language, and sō-ma’ yem (root).

Phytochemistry
The first phytochemical study of this plant was carried out by Michael Benn and Palaniappan Kulanthaivel at the University of Calgary in Canada. These researchers reported the presence of a number of diterpenoid alkaloids: hetisine, 2-dehydrohetisine, 6-deoxydelcorine, dictyocarpine, dihydrogadesine, methyllycaconitine, lycoctonine, takaosamine, nudicaulamine, nudicauline, and nudicaulidine.

The presence of these alkaloids in D. nudicaule implies that the plant is likely to be quite poisonous. The LD50 for MLA is ~5 mg/kg, i.v., in the mouse, and the LD50 for nudicauline is ~3 mg/kg, i.v., in the mouse.

References

External links

Jepson Manual Treatment: Delphinium nudicaule
Univ. of Michigan: Ethnobotany
Delphinium nudicaule — U.C. Photo gallery

nudicaule
Flora of California
Flora of Oregon
Flora of the Sierra Nevada (United States)
Natural history of the California Coast Ranges
Plants used in traditional Native American medicine
Flora without expected TNC conservation status